was a Japanese military leader of the Muromachi period. He was a vassal of the Kyōgoku clan.

1425 births
1486 deaths
Samurai
Taga clan